Anthrazit is the fifth studio album by Austrian musician RAF Camora. Released on 25 August 2017, by RAF Camoras own label Indipendenza, the album debuted at number one on the German, Swiss and Austrian album charts. Anthrazit is certified Gold by IFPI Austria and Platinum by Bundesverband Musikindustrie (BVMI). The album produced six singles, including "Kontrollieren", "In meiner Wolke", "Alles probiert", "Bye, Bye", "Andere Liga" and "Primo". All of the singles reached the charts in German-speaking Europe, which exception of "Bye, Bye", which didn't enter the Swiss charts.

Background
Following the release of his fourth studio album Ghøst (2016), RAF Camora released his fourth collobarative studio album, Palmen aus Plastik (2016), alongside German rapper Bonez MC. RAF Camora announced in April 2017 his fifth studio album, Anthrazit, without giving a specific release date. RAF Camora also announced, his fifth extended play, Schwarze Materie II, which was exclusively distributed through the box set of Anthrazit.

Track listing 
Credits adapted from Tidal.

Charts

Weekly charts

Year-end charts

Certifications

Release history

References

2017 albums
German-language albums
RAF Camora albums